Emma Watson is an English actress and activist. She has won eight Teen Choice Awards, three MTV Movie Awards and has won and been nominated for various other awards throughout her career.

Industry Awards

Young Artist Association 
The Young Artist Award (originally known as the Youth In Film Award) is an accolade bestowed by the Young Artist Association, a non-profit organization founded in 1978 to honor excellence of youth performers, and to provide scholarships for young artists who may be physically and/or financially challenged.

Academy of Science Fiction, Fantasy & Horror Films 
The Saturn Awards are presented annually by the Academy of Science Fiction, Fantasy and Horror Films to honor science fiction, fantasy, horror and genre films

Chlotrudis Society for Independent Film 
The Chlotrudis Society for Independent Film is a non-profit organization that honors outstanding achievement in independent and foreign films.The organization gives out the Chlotrudis Awards.

American Comedy Awards 
The American Comedy Awards were a group of awards presented annually in the United States recognizing performances and performers in the field of comedy, with an emphasis on television comedy and comedy films.

Film festival Awards

Critics Awards

Broadcast Film Critics Association 
The Critics' Choice Movie Awards (formerly known as the Broadcast Film Critics Association Awards) are presented annually by the American-Canadian Critics Choice Association (CCA) to honor the finest in cinematic achievement

Boston Society of Film Critics 
The Boston Society of Film Critics is an organization of film reviewers from Boston, Massachusetts that have bestowed their annual Boston Society of Film Critics Awards since 1981.

Empire Awards 
Presented by the British film magazine Empire, the Empire Awards is a British awards ceremony held annually to recognize cinematic achievements.

Regional Critics Associations

Audience Awards

MTV Movie Awards 
The MTV Movie Awards is a film awards show presented annually on MTV. The nominees are decided by producers and executives at MTV. Winners are decided online by the general public. Presently voting is done through MTV's official website through a special Movie Awards link at movieawards.mtv.com.

People's Choice Awards 
The People's Choice Awards is an American awards show, recognizing the people and the work of popular culture, voted on by the general public. [5] The show has been held annually since 1975. The People's Choice Awards is broadcast on CBS and is produced by Procter & Gamble and Survivor producer, Mark Burnett. In Canada, it is shown on Global.

Other Awards

Footnotes

References

External links
 Awards for Emma Watson at IMDb

Watson, Emma
Emma Watson